René Doumic (7 March 1860, in Paris – 2 December 1937), French critic and man of letters, was born in Paris, and after a distinguished career at the École Normale began to teach rhetoric at the Collège Stanislas de Paris.

Life
Doumic attended the Lycée Condorcet and the École Normale, both in Paris.
He was a contributor to Le Moniteur Universel, the Journal des Débats and the Revue bleue, but was best known as the independent and uncompromising literary critic of the Revue des Deux Mondes.

In 1898, Doumic participated in the French Conferences at Harvard University. He was a Chevalier of the Legion of Honour, president of the Société des gens de lettres (1909), member of the Académie française, and Fellow of the University of Paris. He wrote a number of articles for the Catholic Encyclopedia. 

As editor of the Revue des Deux Mondes he published the work of Jewish-Algerian writer Elissa Rhaïs.

Bibliography
Éléments d'histoire littéraire (1888)
Portraits d'écrivains (1892)
De Scribe à Ibsen (1893)
Écrivains d'aujourd'hui (1894)
Études sur la littérature française (5 vols., 1896-1905)
Les Jeunes (1896)
Essais sur le théâtre contemporain (1897)
Hommes et idées du XIXe siècle (1903)
an edition of the Lettres d'Elvire à Lamartine (1905).

References

External links 

 
 

1860 births
1937 deaths
Writers from Paris
19th-century French writers
20th-century French non-fiction writers
Members of the Académie Française
Lycée Condorcet alumni
École Normale Supérieure alumni
Commandeurs of the Légion d'honneur
Burials at Père Lachaise Cemetery
Members of the Ligue de la patrie française
Contributors to the Catholic Encyclopedia